Hans Kratzert (born 3 February 1940) is a German screenwriter and film director. Kratzert was born in Heerwegen in the Province of Silesia during the Second World War. He was part of the mass emigration of Germans westward following Nazi Germany's defeat during the war. Kratzert's family settled in the Soviet-occupied territory that became East Germany, where he grew up.

After military service, Kratzert began working at DEFA the state-owned East German film company. After making his directoral debut in 1968, Kratzert went on to direct a further thirteen films up to 1989. He made a number of family films and in 1972 directed the Red Western Tecumseh (1972), a biopic of the Native American leader of the same name. The Fall of the Berlin Wall and the closure of DEFA effectively ended his career as a film director.

Selected filmography
 Tecumseh (1972)

References

Bibliography 
 Berghahn, Daniela. Hollywood Behind the Wall: The Cinema of East Germany. Manchester University Press, 2005.

External links 
 

1940 births
Living people
People from Polkowice
People from the Province of Silesia
German film directors
20th-century German screenwriters
German male screenwriters